Nozhay-Yurt (Naƶi-Yurt) is a rural locality (a selo) and the administrative center of Nozhay-Yurtovsky District of the Chechen Republic, Russia. Population:

References

Rural localities in Nozhay-Yurtovsky District